In statistics, the generalized Pareto distribution (GPD) is a family of continuous probability distributions. It is often used to model the tails of another distribution. It is specified by three parameters: location , scale , and shape . Sometimes it is specified by only scale and shape and sometimes only by its shape parameter.

Definition
The standard cumulative distribution function (cdf) of the GPD is defined by

 

The corresponding probability density function (pdf) is

Characterization

 

 ,

again, for  when , and   when .

The pdf is a solution of the following differential equation:

Special cases
If the shape  and location  are both zero, the GPD is equivalent to the exponential distribution.
With shape , the GPD is equivalent to the continuous uniform distribution . 
With shape  and location , the GPD is equivalent to the Pareto distribution with scale  and shape .
(exGPD stands for the exponentiated generalized Pareto distribution.)
GPD is similar to the Burr distribution.

Generating generalized Pareto random variables

Generating GPD random variables 
If U is uniformly distributed on
(0, 1], then

and

Both formulas are obtained by inversion of the cdf.

In Matlab Statistics Toolbox, you can easily use "gprnd" command to generate generalized Pareto random numbers.

GPD as an Exponential-Gamma Mixture 

A GPD random variable can also be expressed as an exponential random variable, with a Gamma distributed rate parameter.

and

then

Notice however, that since the parameters for the Gamma distribution must be greater than zero, we obtain the additional restrictions that: must be positive.

Exponentiated generalized Pareto distribution

The exponentiated generalized Pareto distribution (exGPD) 

For all , the  becomes the location parameter. See the right panel for the pdf when the shape  is positive.

where  and  denote the beta function and gamma function, respectively.

Note that .

The roles of the two parameters are associated each other under  (at least up to the second central moment); see the formula of variance  wherein both parameters are participated.

The Hill's estimator 
Assume that  are  observations (not need to be i.i.d.) from an unknown heavy-tailed distribution  such that its tail distribution is regularly varying with the tail-index  (hence, the corresponding shape parameter is ). To be specific, the tail distribution is described as 

It is of a particular interest in the extreme value theory to estimate the shape parameter , especially when  is positive (so called the heavy-tailed distribution).

Let  be their conditional excess distribution function. Pickands–Balkema–de Haan theorem (Pickands, 1975; Balkema and de Haan, 1974) states that for a large class of underlying distribution functions , and large ,  is well approximated by the generalized Pareto distribution (GPD), which motivated Peak Over Threshold (POT) methods to estimate : the GPD plays the key role in POT approach.

A renowned estimator using the POT methodology is the Hill's estimator. Technical formulation of the Hill's estimator is as follows. Then, with this notation, the Hill's estimator (see page 190 of Reference 5 by Embrechts et al ) based on the  upper order statistics is defined as

In practice, the Hill estimator is used as follows. First, calculate the estimator  at each integer , and then plot the ordered pairs . Then, select from the set of Hill estimators  which are roughly constant with respect to : these stable values are regarded as reasonable estimates for the shape parameter . If  are i.i.d., then the Hill's estimator is a consistent estimator for the shape parameter  .

Note that the Hill estimator  makes a use of the log-transformation for the observations . (The Pickand's estimator  also employed the log-transformation, but in a slightly different way
.)

See also
Burr distribution
Pareto distribution
Generalized extreme value distribution
Exponentiated generalized Pareto distribution
Pickands–Balkema–de Haan theorem

References

Further reading
 
 
 
  Chapter 20, Section 12: Generalized Pareto Distributions.

External links
Mathworks: Generalized Pareto distribution

Continuous distributions
Power laws
Probability distributions with non-finite variance